FINA World Cup might refer to:
FINA Swimming World Cup
FINA Diving World Cup
FINA Synchronised Swimming World Cup
FINA Water Polo World Cup